AMDA – The Society for Post-Acute and Long-Term Care Medicine, commonly called AMDA and previously called AMDA – Dedicated to Long Term Care Medicine and American Medical Directors Association, is a medical specialty professional organization with a focus on providing long-term care.

Work
The society publishes the Journal of the American Medical Directors Association.

An affiliate of AMDA – Dedicated to Long Term Care Medicine, the American Medical Directors Certification Program (AMDCP) accredits Certified Medical Directors (CMD) in long-term care.  The AMDCP's mission is “to recognize and advance physician leadership and excellence in medical direction throughout the long-term care continuum through certification, thereby enhancing quality of care.” The presence of a CMD in nursing homes results in a 15% improvement in quality scores compared to those without CMDs. The AMDCP is the sole organization to accredit Certified Medical Directors in long-term care, and has certified more than 2,700 CMDs since the founding of the program in 1991.

Certification process

Applications to the American Board of Post-Acute and Long-Term Care Medicine (formerly, American Medical Directors Certification Program) are reviewed twice annually. To begin the certification process applicants must be a physician medical director at a long-term care facility, and have completed a post-graduate training program accredited by the U.S. Accreditation Council for Graduate Medical Education or American Osteopathic Association, or a Canadian Royal College of Physicians and Surgeons or College of Family Physicians accredited post-graduate training program. Certification is earned with competence in clinical medicine and medical management in long-term care, after completing educational requirements. Continuing medical education in both clinical and leadership areas is a requirement to retain certification, as well as to recertify in the future. CMDs must recertify after six years.

Certified Medical Director is a certification offered by the American Board of Post-Acute and Long-Term Care Medicine (ABPLM), an affiliate of AMDA – the Society for Post-Acute and Long-Term Care Medicine (AMDA).  The certification indicates a degree of expertise in long-term care, and is aimed at medical directors of nursing homes and similar long-term care facilities.

History
The AMDCP was started in 1991, following the release of Role and Responsibilities of the Medical Director in the Nursing Home, a document supported by the AMDA's House of Delegates.  AMDA recognized the need for a certification program based on the Nursing Home Reform Act of 1987. Credentials of a Certified Medical Director include efficiently acting in clinical and managerial roles while overseeing the long-term care interdisciplinary team.

Impact
According to a 2009 study, nursing homes with AMDA certified CMDs have a 15% higher quality improvement score than those without CMDs. The AMDCP is the only organization to accredit Certified Medial Directors in Long Term Care, and has certified more than 2,700 CMDs since the founding of the program in 1991. The program is accredited by the Accreditation Council for Continuing Medical Education.

Medical Director of the Year Award
The Medical Director of the Year Award (MDOY) is given annually by the AMDA Foundation, an affiliate of AMDA. Nominations are accepted annually and reviewed by a Selection Committee. Recipients are awarded at AMDA's annual symposium, Long Term Care Medicine.

Recipients include:
 2012: Noel DeBacker, MD, CMD 
 2011: Sabine von Preyss-Friedman, MD, CMD 
 2010: Robert Schreiber, MD, CMD 
 2009: Rebecca L. Ferrini MD, MPH, CMD 
 2008: J. Kenneth Brubaker], MD, CMD 
 2007: Timothy Malloy, MD, CMD

See also
American Board of Post-Acute and Long-Term Care Medicine
Certified Medical Director
List of medicine awards

Notes

References

External links

Accreditation Council for Graduate Medical Education
AMDA – Dedicated to Long Term Care Medicine
ABPLM Certified Medical Director in Long Term Care Program Overview
American Osteopathic Association
The College of Family Physicians of Canada
Royal College of Physicians and Surgeons of Canada
 .

Medical associations based in the United States
Medical and health organizations based in Maryland